Chanov is a Russian masculine surname, its feminine counterpart is Chanova. It may refer to
 Viktor Chanov (1959–2017), Ukrainian football goalkeeper
 Vyacheslav Chanov (born 1951), Russian-Ukrainian football coach and a former goalkeeper, brother of Viktor

See also
 Chanov housing estate in the Czech Republic

Russian-language surnames